The Tama languages are a small family of three clusters of closely related languages of northern Papua New Guinea, spoken just to the south of Nuku town in eastern Sandaun Province. They are classified as subgroup of the Sepik languages. Tama is the word for 'man' in the languages that make up this group.

Yessan-Mayo and Mehek are the best documented Tama languages.

Languages
Usher (2020) classifies the Tama languages as follows,
Tama
Pasi–Yamano: Ayi, Pasi, Yamano (Yessan-Mayo)
Mehek–Pahi: Pahi, Mehek
Wogamus: Wogamusin, Chenapian

Foley (2018), following Donald Laycock, provides the following classification.

Tama
Kalou
Ayi
Pahi, Mehek (Makru)
Pasi, Yessan-Mayo (Yamano)

Kalou is actually related to Amal.

Phonology
The Tama languages distinguish /r/ and /l/, unlike many other Papuan languages that have only one liquid consonant.

Vocabulary comparison
The following basic vocabulary words are from Laycock (1968), as cited in the Trans-New Guinea database:

{| class="wikitable sortable"
! gloss !! Mehek !! Pahi !! Yessan-Mayo !! Yessan-Mayo (Warasai dialect)
|-
! head
| terfa || taraʔwey || tara || 
|-
! ear
| namra || wapray || wan || wan
|-
! eye
| lakwo || niaʔwey || la; lə || la
|-
! nose
| wiliŋki || fikihinwi || raŋkɨ; raŋki || haŋki
|-
! tooth
| mpi || piaʔwey || lər; lir || rir
|-
! tongue
| tawul || tafəki || tawlə || kawul
|-
! leg
| suwa || huwa || towa; warə || sowa
|-
! louse
| nunum || nunum || nɨ; ni || niʔ
|-
! dog
| wala || waʔay || wala || wale
|-
! pig
|  ||  || for || 
|-
! bird
| fenre || feydey || ap || apu
|-
! egg
| lakwo || yaʔwey || yen; yɨn || yan
|-
! blood
| kefu || nefum || nap || nap
|-
! bone
| yefa || yefa || yaha || 
|-
! skin
| liki || fuhum || was || 
|-
! breast
| muku || muwi || mu; mukw || mukw
|-
! tree
| moː || muy || me || meʔ
|-
! man
| tama || tama || tama; tamə || kama
|-
! woman
| tawa || tawa || taː || ka
|-
! sun
| nampul || napuy || yabəl; yampəl || yampəl
|-
! moon
| nekwa || nefʔa || lup; lɨyf || lüp
|-
! water
| okwu || oʔwi || ok; okw || okw
|-
! fire
| kiri || irʔi || k-er; kər || kər
|-
! stone
| arkwo || hijopey || pa || papə
|-
! eat
|  ||  || a(m) || 
|-
! one
|  ||  || wurɨ || 
|-
! two
| lisifu ||  || fes || kes
|}

References

 

 
Middle Sepik languages